Puttige may refer to:
 Puthige, Dakshina Kannada, a small village in the Mangalore taluk of Dakshina Kannada district, Karnataka, India
 Puttige (Puthige), a village in Puttur taluk of Dakshina Kannada district
 Puttige (Puthige), a village near Moodabidri in Dakshina Kannada district
 Puthige, Kasaragod, Kerala, India 
 Puttige matha, is one of Ashta Mathas of Udupi established by Madhvacharya.